Trudi Lacey (born December 12, 1958) is an American basketball head coach, most recently of the Washington Mystics of the Women's National Basketball Association (WNBA).

NC State statistics
Source

USA Basketball
Lacey was named to the team representing the US at the inaugural William Jones Cup competition in Taipei, Taiwan. In subsequent years, the teams would be primarily college age players, but in the inaugural event, eight of the twelve players, including Lacey, were in high school. The USA team had a record of 3–4, finishing in fifth place, although one of the wins was over South Korea, who would go on to win the gold medal.

Lacey was chosen to represent the USA on the USA Basketball team at the 1981 World University games, held in Bucharest, Romania. After winning the opening game, the USA was challenged by China, who held a halftime lead. The USA came back to win by two points, helped by 26 points from Denise Curry and 12 from Lacey. The USA was also challenged by Canada, who led at halftime, but the USA won by three points 79–76. The USA beat host team Romania to set up a match with undefeated Russia for the gold medal. The Russian team was too strong, and won the gold, leaving the US with the silver medal. Lacey averaged 6.4 points per game.

Lacey played on the 1983 World University games team, coached by Jill Hutchison. She helped the team win the gold medal.

In 1995, Lacey served as an assistant coach to the R. William Jones Cup Team. The competition was held in Taipei, Taiwan. The USA team won its first six games, but four of the six were won by single-digit margins. Their seventh game was against Russia, and they fell 100–84. The final game was against South Korea, and a victory would assure the gold medal, but the South Korean team won 80–76 to win the gold medal. The USA team won the bronze.

References

External links
Trudi Lacey biography from gopack.com

1958 births
Living people
People from Clifton Forge, Virginia
American women's basketball coaches
American women's basketball players
Charlotte Sting coaches
James Madison Dukes women's basketball coaches
Maryland Terrapins women's basketball coaches
NC State Wolfpack women's basketball players
Universiade gold medalists for the United States
Universiade medalists in basketball
Washington Mystics coaches
Washington Mystics head coaches
Women's National Basketball Association general managers
Medalists at the 1981 Summer Universiade
Medalists at the 1983 Summer Universiade
South Florida Bulls women's basketball coaches
Francis Marion Patriots women's basketball coaches
Queens Royals women's basketball coaches